"No News" is a song recorded by American country music band Lonestar. It was released in January 1996 as the second single from their debut album, Lonestar. "No News" reached the top of the Billboard Hot Country Singles & Tracks chart in April 1996 (see 1996 in country music), giving the group its first number-one single. It was written by Phil Barnhart, Sam Hogin, and Mark D. Sanders.

Content
The song's narrator tells of how his former lover has left him and disappeared without a trace. Having heard "no news" from her or her family, he starts contemplating the possibilities as to where she might be. These include getting lost at the mall, on tour with Pearl Jam, the Grateful Dead (whose singer Jerry Garcia died days after the release of the previous single "Tequila Talkin'"), and Jimmy Buffett, offered as a human sacrifice or being abducted by aliens and believes that even the FBI and CIA may be in on it. The single version replaced the line "Joined the cult, joined the Klan" with "playin' guitar with the band".

Critical reception
Deborah Evans Price, of Billboard magazine reviewed the song favorably, calling it "different, catchy, and utterly infectious." She goes on to say that the production is "first-rate" and that the performance is "right on the mark."

Music video
This was their first music video, and it was directed by Deaton-Flanigen Productions. The video premiered on CMT on January 20, 1996, when CMT named it a "Hot Shot". It begins following the narrative of the song as the woman leaves her man and boards a bus. While on the bus, the previously conservatively-dressed woman begins letting her hair down and dancing provocatively, causing such a stir that the bus overheats and breaks down. She then hitchhikes with a Boss Hogg-like character who pulls up in a Cadillac convertible; he and the girlfriend ride off into the sunset. Meanwhile, her ex-lover sits at home. Scenes also feature the band performing the song outside. A portion of their debut single "Tequila Talkin'" was played at the beginning of the video.

Chart positions
"No News" debuted at number 57 on the U.S. Billboard Hot Country Singles & Tracks for the week of January 13, 1996. The song was commercially released as a double A-side with "Tequila Talkin'"; this double-sided single reached number 22 on the Bubbling Under Hot 100.

Year-end charts

References

1996 singles
1995 songs
Lonestar songs
Music videos directed by Deaton-Flanigen Productions
Songs written by Mark D. Sanders
Song recordings produced by Don Cook
BNA Records singles
Songs written by Sam Hogin
Songs written by Phil Barnhart (songwriter)